Chen Chengda (15 October 1929 – 24 March 2022) was a Chinese football player and manager.

Club career
Born in Shanghai, Chen played youth football in the city for Lianxing and Jingwu. Whilst studying at St. John's University, Shanghai, he played for Shanghai Student Union. In 1950, he joined Shanghai, later joining East China in 1951.

International career
After representing China at under-20 level, Chen represented the senior team in the 1950s. After leaving St. John's University in order to pursue his football career, he played in a number of friendlies for China in preparation for the 1952 Olympics.

Managerial career
Following his retirement, Chen was appointed manager of China in 1958, staying manager until 1962. In 1971, he was appointed manager of the Hebei team, remaining in his post for two years. In 1974, he managed China's under-20's.

Following his managerial career, Chen took up roles at the Chinese Football Association, FIFA and the Asian Football Confederation. He later acted as a consultant to China women's national football team, helping the team to finish runners-up at the 1996 Olympics and the 1999 Women's World Cup.

References

1929 births
2022 deaths
Footballers from Shanghai
Chinese footballers
Association football midfielders
China international footballers
China under-20 international footballers
Shanghai Shenhua F.C. players
Chinese football managers
China national football team managers
Chinese sports executives and administrators